Kiviõli FC Irbis was an Estonian football club based in Kiviõli. Founded in 1999 as Kiviõli Tamme Auto, in 2013 they merged with a local youth team and changed their name to Irbis. The club were members of Esiliiga, the second tier of Estonian football system for eight seasons between 2008 and 2015. Their highest league finish came in 2011 with 3rd position in Esiliiga, missing the promotion play-off to top flight with just one point.

References

External links
Kiviõli Tamme Auto at Estonian Football Association
Kiviõli FC Irbis at Estonian Football Association

Defunct football clubs in Estonia
Association football clubs established in 1999
Association football clubs disestablished in 2016
Ida-Viru County
1999 establishments in Estonia
2016 disestablishments in Estonia